Johan Van Mullem (born 1959) is a Belgian artist living and working near Brussels. He is a painter and sculptor known mainly for his depiction of faces.

Biography
Johan Van Mullem was born in Congo in 1959 to Belgian parents. He grew up moving around the world as a result of his parents various diplomatic postings, including a seven years stay in Tunisia.

Johan has always been an autodidact. He started drawing at the age of five and never stopped since then; same as his father and grandfather.  His family roots are in the city of Bruges.

Later on Johan began exploring etching and painting. Today he paints with etching ink; he is probably one of the only artist using this medium.

At University he studied Architecture.

His paintings are in major private collections and museum collections throughout Europe. He has held solo exhibitions in art galleries located in London, Paris, New York and Brussels. His work was exhibited in various European museums.

Career

Solo shows
2010
 Chapelle de Boondael, Brussels (BEL) 
 Kunstgalerij Anarto, Antwerp (BEL)

2011
 Arthus Gallery, Brussels (BEL)

2012
 "Movements of the Soul", Andipa gallery London (GB)

2013
 "Rebirth", Hus Gallery London (GB)

2014
 "Meta Morphoses", Macadam Gallery, Brussels (BEL)
 C24 Gallery, New York (USA)

2015
 « Face à Face », Galerie Schwab Beaubourg Paris (FR)     
 « Fiat LUX », HUS Gallery London (UK)

2016
 Galerie DUCHOZE Contemporain, Rouen (FR)
 Galerie Espace B, Glabais, (BE)
 « De Anima », The Unit London Gallery, London, (UK)

2017
 Loo & Lou Gallery Paris (FR) « 3 Espaces, 3 Univers »
 Musée d'Ixelles, Bruxelles (BE)

2018
 MACM Musée de Mougins (France)

Group shows
2010
 ART GALLERY 826, Knokke-le-Zoute, (BEL)
 Été Contemporain Dracenois à Draguignan, (FR)
 Lineart Art Fair, Gand, (BEL)

2011
 London  Art Fair, (GB) with Hus Gallery London Gallery
 Show in Monte Carlo organised by Galerie SEM-ART Monaco

2012
 Show in Gstaad,(CH) with Hus Gallery London
 Istanbul Art Fair (TRQ) with Andipa Gallery London

2013
 BRAFA Art Fair Brussels (BEL), with Sem-Art Gallery Monaco

2014
 São Paulo Int' Art Fair (BRA) with Hus Gallery London   
 Dallas Art Fair (USA) with Hus Gallery  London

2015
 ST'ART Art Fair, Strasbourg (FR) with Macadam Gal. (BEL)  
 « Mosaïques » Show, Troyes (FR), Curator Noorbergen  
 "Kunst in de Kantfabriek" show, Vilvoorde, (BEL)  
 Dallas Art Fair, (USA) with 10 Hanover Gallery London (UK)  
 - «Paysages contemporains », Gal. Schwab Beaubourg Paris (FR)  
 ART'UP Lille Art Fair, (FR) with Macadam Gallery (BEL)

2016
 « Créations Belges », Mazel Galerie, Brussels (BE)
 Yia Art Fair Brussels (BE) with Mazel Galerie
 « This is not a Landscape » Show, PAK, Gistel (BEL)
 « Drawings Rooms #2 » Show, PAK, Gistel (BEL)

2017
 Musée National des Beaux-Arts de Kaunas (Lithuanie)
 Art Paris Art Fair with Loo & Lou Gallery Paris
 MACM Museum Mougins, part of the permanent Exhibition
 "Abstract Ed.#1 & #2, Aeroplastics Gallery, Brussels

References
 Interview Magazine
 Huffington Post
 Artnet Interview
 Neue Luxury

External links
 

1959 births
Living people
Belgian painters